In number theory, the larger sieve is a sieve invented by Patrick X. Gallagher. The name denotes a heightening of the large sieve. Combinatorial sieves like the Selberg sieve are strongest, when only a few residue classes are removed, while the term large sieve means that this sieve can take advantage of the removal of a large number of up to half of all residue classes. The larger sieve can exploit the deletion of an arbitrary number of classes.

Statement 

Then we have

provided the denominator on the right is positive.

Applications 

A typical application is the following result, for which the large sieve fails (specifically for ), due to Gallagher:

Notes

References 

 
 

Sieve theory